Alcoa High School is a 9-12 public high school located in Alcoa, Tennessee. It is the only high school in the Alcoa City Schools system. Recently moved into the NEW Alcoa High School. It is accredited by the Southern Association of Colleges and Schools (SACS).

Academics

Alcoa High School currently uses a block schedule for their classes.

There are three foreign languages offered at Alcoa High School including German, Russian, and Spanish.

Alcoa currently offers various AP courses, such as Statistics, United States History, United States Government, World Geography, and English, as well as several dual enrollment courses in cooperation with Pellissippi State Community College.

Clubs & Activities

Some clubs and activities offered at Alcoa High School include: Band, Key Club, Tech Team, FCA, Scholar's Bowl, Choir, Drama Club, Step Team and various others.

Athletics 

Alcoa's athletic teams are known as the "Tornadoes." The athletic director is Josh Stephens.

Football - The school's football team has won 21 TSSAA state championships, to best their rival Maryville High School (16) for the most in state history. Seven of these came in 2004-2010 in Class 2A and later Class 3A, during which the team recorded 84 wins and only six losses, including a 43-game winning streak that was ranked among the best in the nation. The win-streak ended when Alcoa was defeated by Maryville at the beginning of the 2011 season. Randall Cobb, who was drafted by the Green Bay Packers, is among the football alumni from that championship stretch. The team's latest championship came after a victory over Christ Presbyterian Academy in the Class 3A finals in 2013. One year later, on December 5, 2014, Alcoa lost the 2014 3A finals to Christ Presbyterian Academy, by a score of 7-0.
Men's Soccer - The men's soccer team made it to the state tournament in both the 2009 and 2010 seasons under coach Tom Gorman. They were runners-up in the 2009 state championship, the best outcome since the program's start. The team is currently coached by Shane Corley.
Golf - Three individuals have won the TSSAA State Golf Tournament Individual title in the school's history, the most recent being in 2010. The golf team is coached by Chad Coker.
Men's Basketball - The men's basketball team is coached by Ryan Collins.
Women's Basketball - The women's basketball team is coached by David Baumann.
Baseball - The baseball team is coached by Steve Dunn.
Softball - The softball team is coached by Sara Bailey
Women's Soccer -  The Lady T's Soccer team won the State Championship in 2017 and made it to the State Semi-Finals in the 2018 season. The women's soccer team is coached by Andrew Byrd.
Wrestling-Established: 1999-2000 2X State Traditional Runner Up (2014, 2016) 6X Region Dual Champions (2014, 2015, 2016, 2017, 2018, 2019) 12 Individual State Champions 34 Individual State Medalists. The Wrestling team is coached by Brian Gossett.

Notable alumni
 Albert Davis, SR (TSU) 1971 Philadelphia Eagles (14 games)
Randall Cobb, American football wide receiver for the Green Bay Packers of the National Football League, Round 2 Pick 64 in the  2011 NFL Draft
 Dave Davis, former wide receiver in the National Football League, played for the Green Bay Packers, Pittsburgh Steelers and the New Orleans Saints
 Tim George, former NFL football player
 Shannon Mitchell, former tight end in the National Football League, played for the San Diego Chargers for 4 years. Attended the University of Georgia.
 Billy Williams, NFL player

References

External links 
 Alcoa High School Web Page 
 Alcoa City Schools District Page 
Alcoa iHigh Page
 Alcoa High School Football 
 Alcoa High School Band 
 Alcoa High School Soccer

Public high schools in Tennessee
Schools in Blount County, Tennessee
Alcoa, Tennessee